Lane-end is a hamlet in the parish of Egloshayle, Cornwall, England. It is in the civil parish of St Mabyn

References

Hamlets in Cornwall